UTC−06:00 is an identifier for a time offset from UTC of −06:00. 
In North America, it is observed in the Central Time Zone during standard time, and in the Mountain Time Zone during the other eight months (see daylight saving time). Several Latin American countries and a few other places use it year-round.

As standard time (Northern Hemisphere winter)
Principal cities: Mexico City, Chicago, Dallas, Houston, St. Louis, Minneapolis, Austin, Kansas City, San Antonio, Nashville, Milwaukee, Puebla, Oklahoma City, Winnipeg, Orizaba, Regina

North America
CST is standard time in the 6th time zone west of Greenwich, reckoned at the 90th meridian; used in North America in some parts of Canada, Mexico and the United States.
Canada (Central Time Zone)
Manitoba
Nunavut
Kivalliq Region except Southampton Island (Coral Harbour)
Ontario
 West of 90° west
Mexico
All except Baja California, Baja California Sur, Chihuahua, Nayarit, Quintana Roo, Sinaloa and Sonora.
 A small enclave of the UTC-6 time zone is followed in the municipality of Bahía de Banderas, Nayarit, due to its strong economic ties with the neighboring municipality of Puerto Vallarta, Jalisco. In most UNIX-like operating systems this area is represented as Americas/Bahia_Banderas.
United States (Central Time Zone)
Florida
The counties of Bay, Calhoun, Escambia, Holmes, Jackson, Okaloosa, Santa Rosa, Walton, and Washington, and northern Gulf county (panhandle)
Illinois
Indiana
Northwestern counties of Jasper, Lake, LaPorte, Newton, Porter and Starke
Southwestern counties of Gibson, Perry, Posey, Spencer, Vanderburgh and Warrick
Iowa
Kansas
Entire state except Greeley, Hamilton, Sherman and Wallace counties
Kentucky
The counties of Breckinridge, Grayson, Hart, Green, Adair, Russell and Clinton, and all counties to the west of these
Louisiana
Michigan
The western counties of Dickinson, Gogebic, Iron and Menominee
Minnesota
Mississippi
Missouri
Nebraska
Central and eastern Nebraska
North Dakota
Entire state except southwest
Oklahoma
Entire state except Kenton
South Dakota
Eastern half
Tennessee
Counties to the west of the counties of Scott, Morgan, Roane, Rhea, and Hamilton
Texas
All except westernmost counties
Wisconsin

As daylight saving time (Northern Hemisphere summer)
Principal cities: Denver, Billings, Boise, Salt Lake City, Albuquerque, El Paso, Edmonton, Calgary, Ciudad Juárez

North America
Canada (Mountain Time Zone)
Alberta
British Columbia
 The south-eastern communities of Cranbrook, Golden, Invermere and Kimberley
Northwest Territories
Nunavut
Kitikmeot Region
Saskatchewan
Lloydminster
Mexico
Baja California Sur, Chihuahua, Nayarit and Sinaloa states
United States (Mountain Time Zone)
Arizona - Navajo Nation only
Colorado
Idaho
South of Salmon River
Kansas
The western counties of Greeley, Hamilton, Sherman and Wallace
Montana
Nebraska
The western counties of Cherry (western part), Hooker, Arthur, Keith, Perkins, Chase and Dundy, and all counties to the west of these
Nevada
West Wendover
New Mexico
North Dakota
The Southwestern counties of Adams, Billings, Bowman, Dunn (southern part), Golden Valley, Grant, Hettinger, McKenzie (southern part), Sioux (west of ND route 31), Slope and Stark
Oklahoma
Kenton
Oregon
Malheur County (except a small strip in the south)
South Dakota
The western counties of Corson, Dewey, Stanley (western part), Jackson and Bennett, and all counties to the west of these
Texas
 The western counties of Culberson (northwestern part), El Paso and Hudspeth
Utah
Wyoming

As standard time (year-round)
Principal cities: Guatemala City, Tegucigalpa, Managua, Belmopan, Belize City, San José, San Salvador, Huntsville, Little Rock, Saskatoon

Central America
Belize
Costa Rica
El Salvador
Guatemala
Honduras
Nicaragua
Called Central America Time Zone

North America
Canada (Central Time Zone)
Saskatchewan
 All province except Lloydminster
United States (Central Time Zone)
Alabama
Arkansas

Oceania

East Pacific
Ecuador
Galápagos Province

As standard time (Southern Hemisphere winter)
Principal settlement: Hanga Roa

Oceania

East Pacific
Chile
Easter Island

See also
Time in Canada
Time in Chile
Time in Ecuador
Time in Mexico
Time in the United States

References

External links

UTC offsets